South Shields is a borough constituency represented in the House of Commons of the Parliament of the United Kingdom. It elects one Member of Parliament (MP) by the first past the post system of election. It has been represented by Emma Lewell-Buck of the Labour Party since 2013.

The seat was created by the Reform Act 1832 as a single-member parliamentary borough.

The current constituency covers the area of South Shields in the South Tyneside district of Tyne and Wear.

Boundaries

1832-1918 
Under the Parliamentary Boundaries Act 1832, the contents of the borough were defined as the Respective Townships of South Shields and Westoe.

See map on Vision of Britain website.

1918–1950 
The County Borough of South Shields.

Expanded to be coterminous with County Borough.

1950–1951 
As prior but with redrawn boundaries.

Expanded southwards, including the communities of Harton, transferred from Houghton-le-Spring.

1951–1983 
As prior but with redrawn boundaries.

1983–1997 
The Metropolitan Borough of South Tyneside wards of All Saints, Beacon and Bents, Cleadon Park, Harton, Horsley Hill, Rekendyke, Tyne Dock and Simonside, Westoe, West Park, and Whiteleas.

Minor changes to take account of ward boundaries of the newly formed metropolitan borough, including the transfer of Biddick Hall to Jarrow.

1997–2010 
The Metropolitan Borough of South Tyneside wards of All Saints, Beacon and Bents, Biddick Hall, Cleadon Park, Harton, Horsley Hill, Rekendyke, Tyne Dock and Simonside, Westoe, West Park, and Whiteleas.

Biddick Hall gained back from Jarrow.

2010–present 

The Metropolitan Borough of South Tyneside wards of Beacon and Bents, Biddick and All Saints, Cleadon Park, Harton, Horsley Hill, Simonside and Rekendyke, Westoe, West Park, Whitburn and Marsden, and Whiteleas.

Boundary changes for the 2010 general election transferred the community of Whitburn into the South Shields constituency from the neighbouring Jarrow seat.

Members of Parliament
The seat was held from 2001 to 2013 by David Miliband, who served as Foreign Secretary from 2007 until Labour's general election defeat of 2010. On 26 March 2013 Miliband announced his resignation from Parliament in order to take up a post as the head of the International Rescue Committee in New York City.

With two exceptions (Arthur Blenkinsop and Emma Lewell-Buck) every South Shields MP since 1929 has been a cabinet member at some point in their career. However, Blenkinsop was a junior minister, and Lewell-Buck has been a shadow minister. Two of them, Chuter Ede (Home Secretary) and Miliband (Foreign Secretary), have held one of the great offices of state while MP for South Shields.

The Open Spaces Society in 2013 observed that there has been a tradition of South Shields MPs, from Chuter Ede onwards, promoting the cause of public access and common land.

Elections

Elections in the 2010s

Elections in the 2000s

Elections in the 1990s

Elections in the 1980s

Elections in the 1970s

Elections in the 1960s

Elections in the 1950s

Elections in the 1940s

Elections in the 1930s

Elections in the 1920s

Elections in the 1910s

Elections in the 1900s

Elections in the 1890s

Elections in the 1880s

Elections in the 1870s

Elections in the 1860s

Elections in the 1850s

Elections in the 1840s

Elections in the 1830s

See also
 List of parliamentary constituencies in Tyne and Wear
 History of parliamentary constituencies and boundaries in Tyne and Wear
 History of parliamentary constituencies and boundaries in Durham

References
Specific

General
Craig, F. W. S. (1983). British parliamentary election results 1918–1949 (3 ed.). Chichester: Parliamentary Research Services. .

Parliament
Parliamentary constituencies in Tyne and Wear
Constituencies of the Parliament of the United Kingdom established in 1832